The Krajina dinar was the currency of the Republic of Serbian Krajina between 1992 and 1994.

History
There were three distinct dinars. The first was introduced in 20 July 1992 in parallel with the new Yugoslav dinar of that year, to which it was equal. The second dinar replaced the first at a rate of 1 million to one on 1 October 1993, whilst the third replaced the second at a rate of 1 billion (109) to one on 1 January 1994. In 1995, Croatia took control of the region and the Croatian kuna became the currency. No coins were issued for any of the three dinara.

Banknotes

In 1991, three uniface war loan certificates denominated in 10,000, 20,000, and 50,000 динара (dinara) were prepared, but never issued. Although these resemble banknotes, they are not banknotes. These were followed, on 20 July 1992, by regular type notes for 10, 50, 100, 500, 1000 and 5000 dinars. Later in 1992, notes were issued by the Narodna Banka Republike Srpske Krajine (National Bank of Republic of Srpska Krajina) in denominations of 10,000 and 50,000 dinars. These were followed by notes for 100,000, 1 million, 5 million, 10 million, 20 million, 50 million, 100 million, 500 million, 1 billion, 5 billion and 10 billion dinars. When the second dinars was introduced later in 1 October 1993, notes were issued in denominations of 5000, 50,000, 100,000, 500,000, 5 million, 100 million, 500 million, 5 billion, 10 billion and 50 billion. On 1 January 1994, the third dinar was issued in denominations of 1000, 10,000, 500,000, 1 million and 10 million dinars.

Abolishment 
On 15 February 1994, the "Protocol on the establishment of a single monetary system in the territory of the FR Yugoslavia, Republika Srpska and RSK" and the "Decree on the new dinar" was signed so that the Yugoslav dinar would replace the Krajina dinar and Republika Srpska dinar entirely.

See also

 Yugoslav dinar
 Economy of Republic of Serbian Krajina
 Republika Srpska dinar
 Croatian dinar
 Bosnia and Herzegovina dinar
 Hyperinflation

References

External links
 Dinar Republike Srpske Krajine 1991-1994 

Currencies of Croatia
Currencies of Europe
Modern obsolete currencies
Republic of Serbian Krajina
1992 establishments in Europe
1995 disestablishments in Europe
1990s economic history
1992 establishments in Croatia